John Cartledge (16 May 1855 – 8 July 1907), born John Cartledge Foster, was an English cricketer who played for Derbyshire in 1878.

Cartledge was born in Burton Joyce, Nottinghamshire. He took part in a Derbyshire vs. All England Eleven fixture in the 1878 season  Nine of the players in the All England Eleven were past, present, or future Test cricketers, and Derbyshire lost by seven wickets. Cartledge played as a lower-middle order batsman and was dismissed by Alfred Shaw for 1 and Dick Barlow for 0. Cartledge played a game for Nottinghamshire Colts in 1879.

Cartledge died in Stoke Bardolph, Nottinghamshire at the age of 52.

References

1855 births
1907 deaths
English cricketers
Derbyshire cricketers
People from Burton Joyce
Cricketers from Nottinghamshire